The 2019 Youngstown State Penguins football team represented Youngstown State University in the 2019 NCAA Division I FCS football season. They were led by fifth-year head coach Bo Pelini and played their home games at Stambaugh Stadium. They were a member of the Missouri Valley Football Conference. They finished the season 6–6, 2–6 in MVFC play to finish in eighth place.

Previous season

The Penguins finished the 2018 season 4–7, 3–5 in MVFC play to finish in a three-way tie for sixth place.

Preseason

MVFC poll
In the MVFC preseason poll released on July 29, 2019, the Penguins were predicted to finish in seventh place.

Preseason All–MVFC team
The Penguins did not have any players selected to the preseason all-MVFC team.

Schedule
YSU has scheduled 12 games in the 2019 season instead of the 11 normally allowed for FCS programs. Under a standard provision of NCAA rules, all FCS teams are allowed to schedule 12 regular-season games in years in which the period starting with Labor Day weekend and ending with the last Saturday of November contains 14 Saturdays.

Game summaries

vs. Samford

Howard

Duquesne

Robert Morris

at Northern Iowa

South Dakota State

at Southern Illinois

Western Illinois

North Dakota State

at South Dakota

at Indiana State

Illinois State

Ranking movements

References

Youngstown State
Youngstown State Penguins football seasons
Youngstown State Penguins football